The Schooner Gang is a 1937 British crime film directed by W. Devenport Hackney and starring Vesta Victoria, Billy Percy and Gerald Barry.

It was made as a quota quickie at Cricklewood Studios. Location shooting took place in Leigh-on-Sea.

Synopsis
A criminal gang force an innkeeper to assist them in a plan to rob a haul of jewels.

Cast
 Vesta Victoria as Mrs. Truman
 Billy Percy as Freddie Fellowes 
 Gerald Barry as Carleton 
 Percy Honri as Adam 
 Mary Honri as Mary 
 Betty Norton as Mary Truman 
 Basil Broadbent as Jack Norris 
 Frank Atkinson as Ben Worton

References

Bibliography
 Chibnall, Steve. Quota Quickies: The British of the British 'B' Film. British Film Institute, 2007.
 Low, Rachael. Filmmaking in 1930s Britain. George Allen & Unwin, 1985.
 Wood, Linda. British Films, 1927-1939. British Film Institute, 1986.

External links

1937 films
British crime films
British black-and-white films
1937 crime films
1930s English-language films
Films shot at Cricklewood Studios
Quota quickies
Films set in England
Butcher's Film Service films
1930s British films